Rhodognaphalon<ref>Roberty G (1953) Bull. Inst. Franç. Afrique Noire;; 15: 1404.</ref> is a genus of flowering plant in the family Malvaceae: found in tropical Africa.

Selected speciesPlants of the World Online currently includes:
 Rhodognaphalon brevicuspe (Sprague) Roberty - type species
 Rhodognaphalon lukayense (De Wild. & T.Durand) A.Robyns
 Rhodognaphalon mossambicense (A.Robyns) A.Robyns (synonym Rhodognaphalon schumannianum)
 Rhodognaphalon stolzii'' (Ulbr.) A.Robyns

References

Bombacoideae
Malvaceae genera
Taxonomy articles created by Polbot